"No Good Read Goes Unpunished" is the fifteenth episode of the twenty-ninth season of the American animated television series The Simpsons, and the 633rd episode of the series overall. It aired in the United States on Fox on April 8, 2018.

Plot
The entire city of Springfield is ready to watch a nonstop marathon of every episode of The Itchy & Scratchy Show. After hours of watching the marathon, a frustrated Marge forces everyone in the family to give up their electronics for the day. After failed trips to the library and a modern book store, Marge takes the family to an old time book store. While at the book store, Bart tries to purchase tickets to a Tunnelcraft video game convention, but Homer refuses to allow Bart to purchase the tickets. This leads Bart to purchase The Art of War so that he can use the book to manipulate Homer into allowing him to go to the convention. At school, Bart tests the book's advice by stopping Nelson from beating him up for reading the book by irritating and distracting him. He takes his knowledge further by bribing Homer's friends to help him carry out his plan, which includes keeping Homer distracted and making him paranoid with items such as gongs and banners. After one incident where he nearly drowns in a lake of mud after eating a series of milk balls in a trap set by Bart, Homer relents and takes Bart and Milhouse to the video game convention.

At the convention, Homer runs into Daniel Radcliffe, and then blackmails Milhouse into revealing the reason behind Bart's manipulative behavior. He then reads the book to manipulate Bart by acting like and hanging out with Ned Flanders, including wearing a fake moustache to look like him. This climaxes with Homer, Bart and Ned going to see an old silent movie based on Silent Night. Bart pleads with his father to become normal again, which Homer agrees to on the condition that Bart provide him with the remainder of his Halloween candy. The two then reconcile after admitting they both read the book, and proceed to watch another silent movie in the theater with Ned.

Meanwhile, Marge purchases an old book called The Princess in the Garden that used to be her favorite while growing up. She hopes to read it to Lisa, but realizes it is actually culturally offensive in many different ways. In a dream sequence, Marge meets Rudyard Kipling, author of The Jungle Book, who tells her that it is okay to be racist. Also in the dream, she meets the author of The Princess in the Garden, Heloise Hodgeson Burwell, who gives her permission to rewrite the story to lessen the offensive stereotypes and clichés, but after Marge reads her edited version to Lisa, the two agree that it has lost meaning along with its "spirit and character". Lisa takes Marge to Springfield University, where she is told by modern scholars that the book is a subversive satire of conformity. However, Marge is not entirely convinced, and the scholars admit that they do not completely believe it either, but they are drinking heavily, and are therefore somewhat more inclined to ignore their feelings of scepticism.

Reception
Although the episode received positive reception, Dennis Perkins of The A.V. Club gave this episode a D+, stating, "Irritating on several simultaneous levels, 'No Good Read Goes Unpunished' would be more bothersome if it were more memorable."

"No Good Read Goes Unpunished" scored a 0.9 rating with a 4 share and was watched by 2.15 million people, making it Fox's highest rated show of the night.

Allusion to The Problem with Apu
The episode alludes to the 2017 documentary The Problem with Apu written by and starring Hari Kondabolu, which addressed the issues surrounding racial stereotypes seen in Simpsons character Apu Nahasapeemapetilon. While a framed autographed photo of Apu sits in the foreground, Lisa says, "Something that started decades ago and was applauded and inoffensive is now politically incorrect. What can you do?" Marge replies, "Some things will be addressed at a later date." Lisa adds, "If at all."

Kondabolu was disappointed that the show reduced the film's "larger conversation about the representation of marginalized groups" into a specific complaint, vocalized by Lisa, that the character is "politically incorrect".

Later that week, Al Jean stated that he would attempt "to try to find an answer that is popular [and] more important right."

References

External links
 

2018 American television episodes
The Simpsons (season 29) episodes
Rudyard Kipling